The Giula is a right tributary of the river Borșa in Romania. It flows into the Borșa in the village Borșa.

References

Rivers of Romania
Rivers of Cluj County